The Tambour of Retribution is a 2020 Saudi Arabian drama film directed by Abdulaziz Alshlahei. It was selected as the Saudi Arabian entry for the Best International Feature Film at the 94th Academy Awards.

Cast
 Adwa Fahad
 Rawya Ahmed

See also
 List of submissions to the 94th Academy Awards for Best International Feature Film
 List of Saudi Arabian submissions for the Academy Award for Best International Feature Film

References

External links
 

2020 films
2020 drama films
Saudi Arabian drama films
2020s Arabic-language films